Sparna lycoides is a species of beetle in the family Cerambycidae. It was described by Thomson in 1864. It is known from Bolivia.

References

Colobotheini
Beetles described in 1864